The 1824 United States presidential election in Georgia took place between October 26 and December 2, 1824, as part of the 1824 United States presidential election. The state legislature chose 9 representatives, or electors to the Electoral College, who voted for President and Vice President.

During this election, the Democratic-Republican Party was the only major national party, and 4 different candidates from this party sought the Presidency. Georgia cast 9 electoral votes for William H. Crawford.

Results

References

Georgia
1824
1824 Georgia (U.S. state) elections